The 2022 season was the Oval Invincibles second season of the 100 ball franchise cricket, The Hundred. The women's team were the reigning champions from the 2021 season, and proved to be the best team in the women's format once again, beating Southern Brave in the final for the second successive season, winning their second tournament.

Players

Men's side 
 Bold denotes players with international caps.

Women's side 
 Bold denotes players with international caps.

Group fixtures

Fixtures (Men)

Fixtures (Women)

Due to the shortened women's competition, Oval Invincibles didn't play against Welsh Fire.

Standings

Women

 advanced to Final
 advanced to the Eliminator

Men

 advanced to Final
 advanced to the Eliminator

Knockout stages

Women

Final

References

The Hundred (cricket)
2022 in English cricket